ABCD: American Born Confused Desi is an Indian Telugu-language drama film directed by Sanjeev Reddy and produced by Madhura Sreedhar Reddy. The film stars Allu Sirish and Rukshar Dhillon. The phrase American-Born Confused Desi describes Indians born in America, who have difficulty in balancing their ethnic culture within the majority non-Indian American culture. The film is a remake of the Malayalam film of the same name starring Dulquer Salmaan and was released on 17 May 2019.

Plot 
The story revolves around two spoiled youngsters, Aravind and his cousin Bhasha. Avi is the son of a millionaire who is settled in New York, while Bhasha's mother left for Paris with her new husband. Aravind and Bhasha enjoy their luxurious life by driving expensive cars, going to pubs, etc. Avi's father decides to send them to India, telling them it is a vacation, but then blocks their credit cards, forcing them to live in poverty in Andhra Pradesh, where they eventually become famous. Aravind and Bhasha try to stay at a hotel, unaware that their credit cards have been blocked, but are soon aware of this fact and try to escape from the hotel to avoid paying. However, they are caught by the hotel manager, who confiscates their visas until they are able to pay. Avi and Bhasha are given very poor accommodations by Avi's father. They try to make money by trading fake bills but are duped.

Both Avi and Bhasha join a college to finish their MBA (which was forced to do by Avi's father). Later in the college, he meets Neha and Avi falls in love with her. After a series of events, Neha too reciprocates her feelings towards Avi. Aravind inadvertently becomes a candidate for the Mr. Fame award, and realizes that he can return to America by winning the award and receiving the prize money (500,000 rupees). Bhasha and Avi participate in a protest to increase their popularity, but the event ends up in police lathi charge. Although the event increases the popularity of Aravind and Bhasha, it also draws the attention of Bhargav, another Mr. Fame candidate and the son of a minister, who tries to break up the protest through violent means. Amidst the violence, Aravind is finally able to understand and sympathize with the struggles that people born into poverty experience. Avi wins the Mr. Fame award, but confesses the motives behind his actions onstage. Aravind chooses to stay in India and complete his degree.

Cast 
 Allu Sirish as Aravind Prasad ''Avi''
 Rukshar Dhillon as Neha
 Raja Chembolu as Lanka Barghav
 Nagendra Babu as Aravind's father
Kalyani Natarajan as Aravind's mother
 Vennela Kishore as Kishore
 Master Bharath as Bala Shanmugam "Bhasha"
 Kota Srinivasa Rao as Koteswara
 Subhalekha Sudhakar as Barghav's father
 Dammu Devena as Devena
 Viva Harsha as Santosh
 Samba as News Reader
 Appaji Ambarisha as Principal

Production 

Geeta arts

Soundtrack 

The soundtrack of the film was composed by Judah Sandhy and lyrics by Bhaskarabhatla, Krishna Kanth and Tirupathi Jaavana.

Release and marketing 
The film was theatrically released on 17 May 2019. The film was also dubbed in Hindi and directly premiered by Goldmines Telefilms on Dhinchaak on 20 February 2021.

References

External links
 

2019 films
2010s Telugu-language films
Indian comedy films
Telugu remakes of Malayalam films
2019 comedy films